North Fork Vermejo River is a tributary of the Vermejo River. The river flows from Las Animas County, Colorado south to a confluence with Little Vermejo Creek in Colfax County, New Mexico that forms the Vermejo River.

See also
 List of rivers of Colorado
 List of rivers of New Mexico

References

Rivers of Colorado
Rivers of New Mexico
Rivers of Las Animas County, Colorado
Rivers of Colfax County, New Mexico